Stereotypes of French people include real or imagined characteristics of the French people used by people who see the French people as a single and homogeneous group. French stereotypes are common beliefs among those expressing anti-French sentiment.

There exist stereotypes of French people amongst themselves depending on the region.

England
Stereotypes of the French by the British people, especially the English people, have existed for centuries. This is in part due to the many Anglo-French Wars (1193-1815).

United States
Americans view the French as effeminate and cowardly. Francophobia and xenophobic sentiments towards the French have been an established part of the Culture of the United States. The French also have a reputation for being cheap or 'radin' in French, often because they refuse to tip. They tend to spend less on food, clothes and cars compared to most Americans.

Common stereotypes

Culinary
The French are commonly regarded to enjoy eating cheese, snails, frog legs, and plenty of bread, particularly baguettes and croissants. The French are also known for their fondness for wine.

High fashion
France, particularly Paris, has been perceived for being a high fashion place where designer clothes and cosmetics are made.

Hygiene
The French are perceived as having poor hygiene, originating from American soldiers during World War II.

Laziness
The perception that French workers are prone to strikes and take a lot of time off has established a stereotype of the French being workshy.

Onion Johnny
A common stereotypical image of French people, especially in British media, was of a man on a bicycle wearing a striped jumper and beret with a string of onions around their neck. This derives from the "Onion Johnny," a nickname for Breton itinerant onion-sellers who cycled around England and Wales in the 20th century; for many British people, this would be their only contact with French people.

Military
Despite being one of the world's leading powers from the 17th–19th centuries, the French military had been perceived as poor in armed combat and could be easily defeated in armed struggles, thus likely to surrender. The stereotype is attributed to France's roles during World War II and the Franco-Prussian War, in which the French government surrendered to German forces. This stereotype was referenced on The Simpsons, where they were described as "Cheese-eating surrender monkeys".

Anti-French sentiment in the United States increased due to the French government's opposition to the 2003 invasion of Iraq. This precipitated the renaming of "French fries" to "Freedom fries" in several congressional cafeterias.

Romance
French people are perceived as being very romantic.

Rudeness
French waiters have been perceived as rude and disrespectful, especially to foreigners who speak little to no French.

Smokers
Smoking in France is a common trope when associated with France, especially the local Gauloises brand.

References

French
Francophobia